Steffen Liebig (born 30 June 1989) is a German international rugby union player, playing for the Heidelberger RK in the Rugby-Bundesliga and the German national rugby union team.

Liebig played in the 2009, 2010, 2011 and 2012 German championship final for Heidelberger RK, losing the first one and winning the following three. He was one of four try scorers for HRK in the high-scoring 2010 final and also scored a try in the 2012 game.

He plays rugby since 1993. His brother, Christopher Liebig, is also a German international.

He made his debut for Germany against Georgia on 6 February 2010.

He was part of a group of German players which were sent to South Africa in 2009 to improve their rugby skills at the  Academy as part of the Wild Rugby Academy program.

Honours

Club
 German rugby union championship
 Champions: 2010, 2011
 Runners up: 2009
 German rugby union cup
 Winners: 2011

Stats
Steffen Liebig's personal statistics in club and international rugby:

Club

 As of 11 May 2012

National team

European Nations Cup

Friendlies & other competitions

 As of 28 April 2013

References

External links
 Steffen Liebig at scrum.com
   Steffen Liebig at totalrugby.de
  Steffen Liebig at the DRV website

1989 births
Living people
German rugby union players
Germany international rugby union players
Heidelberger RK players
Rugby union wings